Ivory Creek is a rural locality in the Somerset Region, Queensland, Australia.

History 
Ivory's Creek Provisional School  opened circa 1894. On 1 January 1909 it became Ivory's Creek State School. It closed circa 1914.

References

Further reading 

  — also includes Mount Beppo State School, Ivorys Creek Provisional School, Cross Roads Provisional School, Ottaba Provisional School, Murrumba State School, Mount Esk Pocket School, Kipper Provisional School, Lower Cressbrook School, Fulham School, Sandy Gully State School, Cooeeimbardi State School, Scrub Creek State School

Suburbs of Somerset Region
Localities in Queensland